Rutuja Sampatrao Bhosale (born 27 March 1996) is an Indian tennis player.

She made her debut for India Fed Cup team in 2012, the same year, she achieved her highest junior ranking of world No. 55.

Bhosale, the former Indian number one in the WTA doubles rankings, attended Texas A&M University and graduated with a degree in Human Resources and Tourism management in 2017.

She married Swapnil Gugale, former captain of Maharashtra Ranji Team in August, 2020.

ITF Circuit finals

Singles: 4 (4 titles)

Doubles: 28 (19 titles, 9 runner-ups)

Fed Cup participation

Singles

Doubles

References

External links
 
 
 

1996 births
Living people
Indian female tennis players
Racket sportspeople from Maharashtra
Sportswomen from Maharashtra
People from Shrirampur
21st-century Indian women
21st-century Indian people
Tennis players at the 2018 Asian Games
Asian Games competitors for India
Texas A&M Aggies women's tennis players